Baba Farid Law College or BFLC is a private law college situated beside Kotkapura Road, Faridkot in the Indian state of Punjab. It offers undergraduate 3 years law course and 5 year Integrated B.A. LL.B. which is approved by Bar Council of India (BCI), New Delhi and affiliated to Punjabi University. This law college is named after Fariduddin Ganjshakar alias Baba Farid and was established in 2004.

References

Law schools in Punjab, India
Educational institutions established in 2004
2004 establishments in Punjab, India